Nina Svetlanova (born in Kiev, Ukraine Ukrainian SSR, January 23, 1932) is a Russian-American concert pianist and educator.  She became a naturalized United States citizen in 1983. She has been a professor of piano at New York's Manhattan School of Music and Mannes College of Music since the late 1970s.  Before her teaching career, she was known as a concert pianist and collaborative artist, being the main pianist to work with Armenian mezzo-soprano Zara Dolukhanova.

Svetlanova graduated from the Moscow Conservatory in the class of Heinrich Neuhaus, who she studied with from the age of 16 to 23 (1948–1955), during a seven-year period.  Prior to that she had been a student of Grigory Kogan and Sofia Kogan at the Gnesin Music College, where she studied since the age of five (1937–1948).

Upon graduation from Moscow Conservatory (class of 1955), she became Opera Konzertmeister (opera coach) in the famous Bolshoi Theatre. Later she became a pianist in the official roster of the Moscow Philharmonic Concert Association,  called Moskonzert, which was the main bureau responsible for all concerts in the USSR. As a Moskonzert pianist Svetlanova toured the world playing with instrumentalists and ensembles, and working closely with Zara Dolukhanova.

She moved to New York City in 1975. Her most prominent students are Josu de Solaun Soto, Hyung-ki Joo,  and Brian Zeger, artistic director of Juilliard's Ellen and James S. Marcus Institute for Vocal Arts.

References

External links
 Official site

Living people
American classical pianists
American women classical pianists
Russian classical pianists
Russian women pianists
Manhattan School of Music faculty
1932 births
Soviet emigrants to the United States
People with acquired American citizenship
20th-century American pianists
20th-century American women pianists
21st-century classical pianists
Women music educators
21st-century American women pianists
21st-century American pianists
American women academics